Bahishkrit Hitakarini Sabha is a central institution formed by Dr. Babasaheb Ambedkar for removing difficulties of the untouchables and placing their grievances before government. In order to bring about a new socio-political awareness among the untouchables, Dr.Babasaheb Ambedkar established "Bahishkrit Hitkarini Sabaha" on 20 July 1924 at Bombay. The founding principles of the Sabha were "educate, organize and agitate".

History
In March 1924 to launch social movement for the uplift of the Untouchables Dr. Babasheb Ambedkar convened a meeting on 9 March 1924, at the Damodar Hall, Bombay, to consider the desirability of establishing a central institution for removing difficulties of the untouchables and placing their grievances before government. After much discussion and debate, it was resolved that an institution be established and according it was founded on 20 July 1924, under the title 'Bahishkirt Hitakarini Sabha', and was registered under ActXXI of 1860.

The aims and objects of the Sabha were as under:

 To promote the spread of education among the Depressed Class by opening Hostels or by employing such other means as may seem necessary or desirable.
 To promote the spread of culture among the Depressed study circles.
 To advance and improve the economic condition of the Depressed Classes by starting Industrial and Agricultural schools.
 To represent the grievances of the Depressed Classes.

Members
 Sri Chimanlal Harilal Setalvad - The President of the Bahishkrit Hitakarini Sabha
 Meyer Nissim - Vice-President
 J.P. - Vice-President
 Rustomji Jinwala - Vice-President
 G.K. Nariman - Solicitor
 Dr. R.P. Paranjpye - Solicitor
 Dr. V.P. Chavan - Solicitor
 B. G. Kher - Solicitor
 Dr.B.R.Ambedkar - The Chairman of the managing committee
 S.N. Shivtarkar - Secretary
 N.T.Jadhav - Treasure

Works
The Sabha started one hostel at Solapur for high school students belonging to the depressed classes on 4 Jan 1925. The management of the hostel was entrusted to Shri Jivappa Suba Aydale, a social worker from Solapur.

See also
 Hitkarini Sabha of Jabalpur, an educational and literary society

Notes

Dalit history
Dalit politics
Organisations based in Mumbai
Organizations established in 1924
B. R. Ambedkar
1924 establishments in India